S.N. Sen B.V. Post Graduate College (Surendra Nath Sen Balika Vidyalaya Post Graduate College) is a college for girls. It is located on Mall Road near Phool Bagh Park, Kanpur, Uttar Pradesh in India. It is a government aided college and is affiliated to CSJM University Kanpur.

History

This college was founded in 1953 by Dr. Siddheswar Sen, son of Dr. Surendra Nath Sen.

Affiliation

Agra University — (1957)
University of Kanpur, Kanpur — (1966) (CSJM University Kanpur)

Courses
 Govt. Aided
B.A.:Hindi, English, Sanskrit, Sociology, Philosophy, Education, Psychology, Economics, Political Science, History, Drawing, Painting and Music.
B.Sc.:Zoology, Botany and Chemistry
M.A.:Hindi and Sociology
Self Finance
M.A.:Economics and Education

Management
President - Praveen Kumar Mishra
Secretary - Probir Kumar Sen
Treasurer - Gopal Sharma

References

Women's universities and colleges in Uttar Pradesh
Universities and colleges in Kanpur
Colleges affiliated to Chhatrapati Shahu Ji Maharaj University
Educational institutions established in 1953
1953 establishments in Uttar Pradesh
Postgraduate colleges in Uttar Pradesh